False Pretenses is a 1935 American romantic comedy film directed by Charles Lamont and starring Irene Ware.

Plot
When Mary Beekman (Irene Ware) loses her waitress job after a fight with her loutish boyfriend, trucker Mike O’Reilly (Edward Gargan), she stands at a bridge on a windy night, loses her pay check to the wind and leans over the guardrail to catch it, but socialite Kenneth Alden (Sidney Blackmer) catches her. He’s lost everything that is not already mortgaged. Both down on their luck, they assume that the other is there to jump off the bridge.

Instead, Mary has an idea. If Ken sells shares to a syndicate of his wealthy friends, in a phoney beauty product, they’ll have enough money for some clothes to pass Mary off in society long enough to meet and marry a wealthy bachelor. Then, they can pay everyone back with interest. The con might work, except that Ken has too much integrity to marry Clarissa Stanhope (Betty Compson) for money, and Mary is beginning to see his point when she falls for Pat (Russell Hopton), who has secrets of his own.

The plot boils over when Mike shows up to blow the lid off. Pat's valet is a thief, who promised not to act foolishly, but escapes with a stolen tiara. Meanwhile, Mary plans to leave, so she shares a taxi to the station with Pat's valet. After a police chase, Mary is hauled off to the police station.

It looks like no one is going to end up with anything, but a bad reputation, but, what starts out dramatically ends comically, with everyone getting what he or she really wants out of life.

Cast
 Irene Ware as Mary Beekman
 Sidney Blackmer as Kenneth Alden (as Sydney Blackmer)
 Betty Compson as Clarissa Stanhope
 Russell Hopton as Pat Brennan
 Edward Gargan as Mike O'Reilly
 Ernest Wood as Tiffany Cortland
 Lucy Beaumont as Miss Milgrim
 Marshall Ruth as Gardner
 Dot Farley as Mrs. Smythe

References

External links

False Pretenses (1935), Rotten Tomatoes
False Pretenses (1935), TCM.com

1935 films
1935 romantic comedy films
American romantic comedy films
American black-and-white films
Films directed by Charles Lamont
Chesterfield Pictures films
1930s English-language films
1930s American films